Yuki Shimoda (August 10, 1921 – May 21, 1981) was an American actor best known for his starring role as Ko Wakatsuki in the NBC movie of the week Farewell to Manzanar in 1976. He also co-starred in the 1960s television series Johnny Midnight (39 episodes), with Edmond O'Brien. He was a star of movies, early television, and the stage. His Broadway stage credits include Auntie Mame with Rosalind Russell, and Pacific Overtures, a musical written by Stephen Sondheim and directed by Harold Prince.

During World War II, following the signing of Executive Order 9066, Shimoda was incarcerated to the Tule Lake War Relocation Center.

Broadway stage credits
 Teahouse of the August Moon, Martin Beck Theatre, (1953–1956), as Mr. Keora, choreographer
 Auntie Mame, Broadhurst Theatre, (1956–1958), as Ito
 Pacific Overtures, Winter Garden Theatre, (1975–1976), as Abe, First Councillor

Filmography

Film
 Auntie Mame (1958) as Ito
 Don't Give Up the Ship (1959) as Japanese Colonel (uncredited)
 Career (1959) as Yosho
 All in a Night's Work (1961) as Kim (uncredited)
 The Pleasure of His Company (1961) as Gardner (uncredited)
 Man-Trap (1961) as Japanese Man (uncredited)
 Seven Women from Hell (1961) as Dr. Matsumo 
 A Majority of One (1961) as Mr. Asano's Secretary
 The Horizontal Lieutenant (1962) as Kobayashi
 Once a Thief (1965) as John Ling, Chinese Funeral Director
 Girls Are for Loving (1973) as Ambassador Hahn
 Midway (1976) as Japanese Naval officer on Hiryu
 MacArthur (1976) as Prime Minister Shidahara
 Hito Hata: Raise the Banner (1980) as Takagi
 The Last Flight of Noah's Ark (1980) as Hiro
 The Octagon (1980) as Katsumo, Seikura's aide
 Yuki Shimoda: Asian American Actor (1985) as himself

TV movies and mini-series
 The Impatient Heart (TV movie) (1971)
 Farewell to Manzanar (TV movie) (1976) as Ko Wakatsuki
 And the Soul Shall Dance (TV movie) (1978) as Oka
 A Death in Canaan (TV movie) (1978) as Dr Samura
 The Immigrants (TV movie) (1978) as Feng Wo
 A Town Like Alice (TV mini-series) (1981) as Sgt Mifune (final film role)

TV series

 Hallmark Hall of Fame
 Hawaiian Eye (1959–1961) as Mitho Koyoto / Mitsuki
 Johnny Midnight in role of Japanese manservant Uki (1960) as Aki / Lawyer
 Peter Gunn (1960) as Yuki
 Mister Ed (1961) as Sam
 Adventures in Paradise (1961) as Kenko Yoshimura
 The Tab Hunter Show (1961) as Freddy
 The Case of the Dangerous Robin (1961)
 The Blue Angels (1961) as Japanese Officer
 Follow the Sun (1961) as Bartender
 Alcoa Premiere (1962) as Ti Rong
 Thriller (1962) as Koto
 McHale's Navy (1962) as Major Simuru 
 The Andy Griffith Show (1964) as Mr. Izamoto
 Gomer Pyle, U.S.M.C. (1965) as Oriental Man
 The Big Valley (1965) as Po Hsien
 I Spy (1965–1967) as Mr. Shung / Ishikura / Koyo
 It Takes a Thief (1970) as Salesman
 Ironside (1971–1972) as Ship Captain / Major
 Love American Style (1973) as 2nd Japanese Man (segment "Love and the Impossible Gift")
 Here We Go Again (1973) as Sam
 The Magician (1973) as Father Fred
 Kung Fu (1973–1974) as Shun Low / Man / Bandit / Various Characters
 Police Woman (1974) as Businessman
 Sanford and Son (1974) as Mr. Funai
 Judge Dee and the Monastery Murders (1974) as Pure Faith
 Kojak (1976) as Assassin
 Baa Baa Black Sheep, episode: "Up for Grabs", (1976) as Colonel Samuchi
 Quincy, M.E. (1977) as Dr. Hiro
 The New Adventures of Wonder Woman (1977) as Takeo Ishida
 CHiPs (1977) as Mr. Wee
 Mrs. Colombo (1979) as Soong
 Salvage 1 (1979) as Dr. George Takata
 M*A*S*H (1979–1981) as Key Yong Lu / Chung Ho Kim / Cho Pak

References

External links
 
 
 Yuki imitating Carmen Miranda's "Mama Yo Quiero" while incarcerated in 1942 http://content.cdlib.org/ark:/13030/ft2t1nb12j/

1921 births
1981 deaths
Japanese-American internees
Male actors from Sacramento, California
American male actors of Japanese descent
American male film actors
American male television actors
American film actors of Asian descent
20th-century American male actors